Jeremy Williams may refer to:

Jeremy Huw Williams (born 1969), Welsh baritone opera singer
Jeremy Williams (boxer) (born 1972), American boxer and mixed martial artist
Jeremy Williams (cricketer) (born 1979), English cricketer
Jeremy Williams (actor) (born 1982), British actor
Jeremy Williams (ice hockey) (born 1984), Canadian ice hockey centre
Jeremy Williams (Canadian football) (born 1991), American player of Canadian football
Jeremy Williams (rugby union), Australian rugby union player
Jeremy Marr Williams, American actor, artist, designer and entrepreneur

See also
Jerry Williams (disambiguation)